Kam Tong (December 18, 1906 – November 8, 1969) was a Chinese-American actor. He was best known for his role as Hey Boy on the CBS television series Have Gun, Will Travel and as Dr. Li in the film version of the Rodgers and Hammerstein musical Flower Drum Song. Curiously, though appearing as a series regular on Have Gun, Will Travel he was never afforded a regular featured credit, always instead listed undistinguished from the support guest cast, perhaps an indication of inherent discrimination in that regard.

Kam was also a regular on the short run CBS-TV series Mr. Garlund in 1960. He appeared in many movies, often as an uncredited Chinese, Japanese, or Filipino character. He appeared in many television shows, including The Man from U.N.C.L.E., The Big Valley, The Time Tunnel, The Final War of Olly Winter, and I Spy.

After serving in World War II in an OSS intelligence unit, he became involved in efforts to raise awareness over gun violence. He also owned and operated a restaurant called Shanghai Lil's in San Francisco.

Filmography

References

External links 

1906 births
1969 deaths
American people of Chinese descent
20th-century American male actors
Western (genre) television actors
Burials at Pacific View Memorial Park